Hojjatoleslam Hadi Ghaffari (born June 25, 1950 in Azarshahr) is a member of the central council of Imam assembly forces and the president of the Al-Hadi Institute in Iran. He was accused of murdering the ex-Prime Minister Amir-Abbas Hoveida during the sham trials by Sadeq Khalkhali on April 7, 1979. He was also in charge of supervising Hezbollah of Iran.
 He was member of Islamic Consultative Assembly In the first three periods. He's son of Hossein Ghaffari who was one of the mollas that was tortured to death in prison before the Iranian Revolution.

According to Dr Mir Ali Montazam, one-time first secretary at the Iranian embassy, Ghaffari, was nicknamed the "machinegun mullah" , since he was mostly seen with guns in the early revolution years. Montazam further alleges that Ghaffari played a key part in funding the Provisional IRA during the Troubles. Iranian officials deposited £4 million into a  secret Jersey bank account, funded by the sale of artwork from the Iranian Embassy in London. Ghaffari was sent to Belfast and organized the distribution of the money via sympathetic Irish businessmen.

Iranian Revolution 

During the revolution, he interacted with various student groups, both political and non-political, such as the Freedom Movement, the Mojahedin Khalgh Organization, Fada'iyan-e Islam , and even communist groups, and sometimes participated in inter-group debates.Abbas Milani writes about Ghaffari: The man was famous for his radicalism and his seemingly revolutionary rhetoric and rumors of an attachment to violence, young girls and luxury homes.As for his role in suppressing the 20 June, 1981 Iranian protests , it is reported that Hadi Ghaffari, who was all eyes on him, shouted and addressed the crowd. "Liberals, little communists, tie-dyers, honorable lawyers, honorable professors, ladies ..." and then ... addressed foreigners and said, "Tell the world, this revolution is supported by Mahdi, you have the right to laugh at us, but if your laughing made muslim youth angry, Muslim youth will chew your neck  "It's easy to try and it costs nothing but a neck."

Hoveida Execution
On April 7, 1979, Amir-Abbas Hoveida was transported to Qasr Prison. Quickly shuffled back in front of Khalkhali's tribunal, Hoveida heard the court's indictment at three in the afternoon. Behind locked doors, after final efforts at stalling Hoveida's execution ended in failure, the ex-Prime Minister was taken into the prison's yard. Before reaching the area designated for firing squad executions, Hadi Ghaffari from behind pulled out a pistol and shot Hoveida twice in the neck. As Hoveida fell to the ground, a mercy shot was fired off, ending his life.

See also
Hezbollah of Iran

References

1950 births
Living people
People of the Iranian Revolution
Executioners
Association of Combatant Clerics politicians
Assembly of the Forces of Imam's Line politicians
Islamic Republican Party politicians